Scott Adam Jacoby (born October 31, 1971) is an American record producer, songwriter, composer, sound engineer, and recording artist. He is a Grammy Award winner, and has worked with numerous artists in various genres including Coldplay, Cory Henry, Fabolous, Jackie Evancho, Janelle Monáe, Jason Mraz, John Legend, José James, Kane, Laura Izibor, Maiysha, Naturally 7, Rachel Platten, Ronnie Spector, Sia, Stormzy, Vampire Weekend and Vanessa Hudgens. In 2007, he founded his own record label Eusonia Records, and also established Eusonia Studios.

Early life
Jacoby grew up in Rye, New York, and earned a degree in Psychology from Skidmore College in 1993. Afterwards, he attended Albert Einstein College of Medicine, but left his studies after two years to pursue a career in music.

Career
In 2003, Jacoby signed a record deal with Irma Records to release his debut studio album, Before Now (in 2004). The album was then licensed to Columbia Music Entertainment in Japan, and the first single, "I Like You", went to number 1 on the Japanese radio charts. During this period, Jacoby also worked extensively in sound mixing, including work on the 2006 album, The Carnegie Hall Performance, Lewis Black's fifth album. The album won the Grammy Award for Best Comedy Album at the 49th Annual Grammy Awards, for which Jacoby shared in the Grammy win. In 2008, Columbia released Jacoby's sophomore studio album, After, which featured guest artists and writers, Maiysha, Andrew Wyatt, Jerome Collins of Straight No Chaser, Kevin Michael, and Shelly Peiken.

Despite success as a recording artist, Jacoby's primary focus throughout his career has been on writing, production and mixing. To that end, in 2000, he opened Maze Studios with Allen Towbin, which evolved to become Eusonia Studios in 2010, an "atmospherically inspiring setting" located in Manhattan's Flatiron District. In 2002, Jacoby established his own music production company, SCOJAC Music Productions. , he was the president and CEO. Described as an "anti-specialist", he has worked most notably as a writer, producer, engineer, mixer and musician with numerous artists across a wide range of genres.

In 2011, Jacoby scored the Nicole Beharie film, My Last Day Without You, producing the theme song "My Last Day Without You". The song was a nominee at the 2012 Black Reel Awards for Best Original or Adapted Song. In 2013, Jacoby mixed the Vampire Weekend single "Unbelievers" with Emily Lazar of The Lodge; the song was a popular track on the album Modern Vampires of the City, winner of the 2014 Grammy Award for Best Alternative Music Album. In 2016, Jacoby produced Ronnie Spector's LP English Heart. Rolling Stone noted that the Spector's record, "helmed by producer Scott Jacoby... couldn't sound more different from her ex's dense, claustrophobic signature sound – and that's how she likes it". Jacoby also produced Deva Mahal's debut album Run Deep, released March 23, 2018. On the strength of this release, GRAMMY.com named Mahal their No. 1 in 'Best New Bands' from South by Southwest 2018.

Eusonia records

In 2007, Jacoby founded Eusonia Records, an independent record label, originally distributed by Ryko and later by RED. By 2008, Jacoby had signed progressive soul singer Maiysha to his label, and began collaborating with her on her first album, This Much is True. Jacoby co-wrote and produced the lead single from this album, "Wanna Be", which was nominated for a Grammy in 2009 in the Best Urban Alternative Performance category. , the label had four artists on its roster: Jacoby, Maiysha, SiLyA and Zach Deputy, in addition to releasing the soundtrack for the 2013 film My Last Day Without You. In 2010, Jacoby teamed up with his partner James McKinney to run the label. In 2016, Eusonia partnered with the Anguilla Music Academy and the Grammy Museum to create the Music Revolution Project in Anguilla.

Personal life
Jacoby speaks at music industry events and universities, as both a guest lecturer and a featured speaker.
He has held various positions at the National Academy of Recording Arts and Sciences and in 2016 was the presenter of the Technical Grammy Award. , he resided in Greenwich Village, New York City with his wife and daughters.

Discography

Recording artist
Studio albums
 Before Now (2004)
 After (2008)

Other projects
 Evolution of Creation  (1996)
 Insert  (2000)

Producer, writer and mix engineer
The following is a select list of albums in which Jacoby has worked on as either producer, co-producer, composer, mixer or engineer, showing song title, year released, performing artist(s), album title and role.

Film and television
The following is a list of films, television series and commercials in which Jacoby has worked on as either producer, co-producer, composer, mixer or engineer, showing title/client, project type, role and year released.

References
Notes

Citations

External links

 
 Eusonia Records
 Eusonia Studios

1971 births
Record producers from New York (state)
Songwriters from New York (state)
American multi-instrumentalists
American audio engineers
Living people
People from Greenwich Village